The supra-acromial bursa is located on the superior aspect of the acromion and normally does not communicate with the glenohumeral joint. Supra-acromial bursitis has not been receiving much attention from literature and remains described mainly as case reports of presumptive diagnosis with no histopathological correlation. Since the bursa is supra-acromial, not supraclavicular, fluid-filled masses located over the acromioclavicular joint or distal clavicle do not correspond to supra-acromial bursitis.

See also
 Subacromial bursa
 Subcoracoid bursa

References

Shoulder